Dunmore Stadium was a greyhound racing track located in Belfast, Northern Ireland.

History
Dunmore was the second greyhound stadium to be opened in Ireland, the first meeting at which was held on 6 September 1928. It closed in 2000.

Opening
Dunmore was opened as Belfast's second track after Celtic Park by the United Greyhound Association (Northern Ireland) Ltd. The directors were James McKee (responsible for the McKee/Jim Scott electric hare) and Captain John Ross. The hare system was the first to use an underground wire and it was such a success that McKee and Scott started the M.S Cable Hare Company. McKee also introduced the automatic trap release. The circuit was located near the Antrim Road at Alexandra Park Avenue, North Belfast.

Pre War History
The track established itself as one of the largest circuits in greyhound racing with a huge 575 yard circumference and 22 feet wide, the test of a greyhound's stamina was quite tough being such a big galloping track but this also resulted in minimal racing injuries. A tote was installed in 1930 but only lasted until 1932 due to the government ban that year which forced tracks to shut down the betting facility.

Second World War
During World War II the stadium suffered severe damage which resulted in the main stand being burned down in the 1942 Belfast Blitz. The racing operation moved to across the city centre to Celtic Park for the remainder of the season before being able to race again the following year. It was in 1943 that the Irish National Sprint over 435 yards was introduced and this event earned classic status for sprinters. The first winner was Fair Mistress.

Post War History
The war ended and a rebuild took place in 1946 but without a tote because although UK tracks were allowed to operate totes the government ban in Northern Ireland remained in place. In 1951 the Smirnoff Puppy Cup started and in 1962 the National Sprint champion Tanyard Chief was drowned in the Belfast floods.

Sixty on course bookmakers were operating on course in 1960, an unusually high amount but tote betting was still illegal in Northern Ireland at the time. In 1961 the Sean Graham 700 was introduced and Ian Ross was Racing Manager for thirty years. A leading greyhound called Yellow Printer made his racing debut on 6 June 1967.

By 1974 the troubles were having a considerable bearing on business and financial problems began to mount, a new board of directors consisting of the Jim Delargy, Sean & Brian Graham took over at Dunmore on 1 April 1977. The board included Jack McKee and Jack Hynds. The same Delargy/Graham group would take over Celtic Park less than a year later. Guinness stepped in as the sponsors of the Irish National Sprint and the track became all sand in 1978.

Sean Graham owned a bookmaking firm called Belfast Sporting and Leisure and they controlled the track in the 1980s, Sam Young became Racing Manager and an Australian Bramich hare was used, racing continued on Tuesday, Thursday and Saturday evenings. In 1981 the track introduced a new marathon distance of 1,005 yards, over six bends which indicated just how big the circumference of the track was. A totalisator was finally introduced in 1990. In 1983 the track was the first in Europe to install a Bramich hare.

The track received no support from the Bord na gCon or support from the National Greyhound Racing Club adding to financial problems. The racing ended in March 1997 and the last meeting attracted 3,000 patrons. The site was eventually redeveloped.

Other Sports
As Dunmore Park, it was also the home ground of Brantwood F.C. from 1920–30 and for another four-year period after the Second World War, and occasionally hosted boxing, including Jack O'Brien v Carl Petersen in 1930, Stan Rowan v Bunty Doran and Hughie Smith v Gerry Smythe in 1949.
Hockey internationals were also organised at the venue before the war. Speedway took place during the 1949-1950 season and stock cars would also race around the stadium in the 1960s.

Track records

Competitions
 National Sprint

References

Defunct sports venues in Northern Ireland
Defunct greyhound racing venues in the United Kingdom
Defunct association football venues in Northern Ireland
Defunct speedway venues in the United Kingdom
Greyhound racing in Ireland